
Gmina Bobowa is an urban-rural gmina (administrative district) in Gorlice County, Lesser Poland Voivodeship, in southern Poland. (Bobowa gained town status on 1 January 2009 – prior to that date the district was classed as a rural gmina.)

Villages
Apart from the town of Bobowa, the gmina contains the villages and settlements of Berdechów, Brzana Dolna, Brzana Górna (the latter two forming a single sołectwo called Brzana), Jankowa, Sędziszowa, Siedliska, Stróżna and Wilczyska.

Neighbouring gminas
Gmina Bobowa is bordered by the gminas of Ciężkowice, Grybów, Korzenna and Łużna.

References
Polish official population figures 2006

Bobowa
Gorlice County